Serafima Meleteva or Serafina Rosov (born 29 April 1886) was an abbess of the Catholic Church of the Byzantine Rite, or, in other terminology belonged to the Greek Catholic Church and the Synod of the Russian traditions of the apostolate in the Russian Diaspora.

Biography

Serafina Rosov was born in Stavropol, Russia on 29 April 1886 in an Orthodox family of the Old Style. Her parents were the physician Nicholas Rosov and his legal wife Julia.In 1896, Seraphina Rosov went to Saint Petersburg, and became Mother Superior in 1929. Bishop Paul Meletiou, gave her his sister, nowhere in the document refer names of their parents so Abbess Seraphim could be, or his half-sister, or just a "sister in Christ."
Since 1944 in exile, in 1946, together with Bishop Paul Meletiou moved from Orthodoxy to Catholicism. Meleteva lived in the center "of the East-Christian center "at the publishing house" Life with Bohr "in Brussels participated in worship at the church of the Annunciation. She was buried in the cemetery Woluwe-Saint-Pierre in Brussels. Some documents of a personal nature, and books are available in the archives of the Abbess' Christian Russia in Seriate, Italy.

References

Vladimir Kolupaev, Brussels publisher "Life with God": Book World Russian abroad XX century: Radiomissiya for Soviet listeners. Saarbrücken, 2012. 336 p. 

Vladimir Kolupaev. Life Bishop Paul Meleteva: Serving Church and home in Russia, the Soviet Union and abroad. Saarbrücken, 2012. 125 s., Ill.  , 

Seventy Bishop Paul (Melentyeva) / / Russia and the Universal Church, 1959, No. 1 (29). C.5.

Russia and the Universal Church, 1962, No. 4. p. 2.

"Life with God": Description of archives. / Vladimir Kolupaev, Fondazione «Russia Cristiana». Pro manoscritto. Seriate (Bg), Italia: «Russia Cristiana», 2009. 54 c.

External links
 http://zarubezhje.narod.ru/rs/s_167.htm
 http://zarubezhje.narod.ru/texts/Vladimir_Kolupaev_ZhiznSBogom.htm
 http://krotov.info/history/20/iz_istori/mel8.htm
 http://zarubezhje.narod.ru/texts/frrostislav3.htm

1886 births
Converts to Eastern Catholicism from Eastern Orthodoxy
Former Russian Orthodox Christians
Russian Eastern Catholics
Year of death missing